San Jose Airport (Filipino: Paliparan ng San Jose) , formerly known as McGuire Field, is an airport serving the general area of San Jose, Occidental Mindoro in the Philippines. It is one of three airports in Occidental Mindoro, the others being Mamburao Airport and Lubang Airport.  The airport is classified as a Principal class 1 domestic airport by the Civil Aviation Authority of the Philippines, an agency of the Department of Transportation that is responsible for the operations of not only this airport but also of all other airports in the Philippines, except the major international airports.

History
San Jose Airport was originally an American air facility which operated in the latter years of World War II. The airstrip was formerly named after World War II 5th Air Force ace Major Thomas McGuire. Consolidated B-24 Liberators were stationed in the facility.

After the war, the air facility was abandoned by American forces, the national government renovated the air facility and was inaugurated years later in 1951 by then President Elpidio Quirino. The national government later built a concrete road from the town center to the airport as well as converted the wooden bridge over the Pandurucan River into a concrete bridge.

The airport underwent a rehabilitation sometime around 2013.

Facilities

It can accommodate aircraft as large as the Airbus A320.

Airlines and destinations

Passenger

See also

 List of airports in the Philippines

References

External links

 Pacific Wrecks - McGuire Field (San Jose Airport)
 

Airports in the Philippines
Buildings and structures in Occidental Mindoro
Transportation in Luzon
Airfields of the United States Army Air Forces in the Philippines